Nightly Trembling is the second album from experimental indie rock band Six Organs of Admittance. It was originally a limited release in 1999 and was re-released in 2003. It was also contained in the box set RTZ

Track listing 
 "Redefinition of Being" – 18:25
 "Creation Aspect Fire (Reprise)" – 11:59
 "Creation Aspect Earth" – 5:56

References 

1999 albums
Six Organs of Admittance albums